Loose is the third studio album by Canadian singer-songwriter Nelly Furtado, released on 7 June 2006, by Geffen and Mosley Music Group. Following the release of Furtado's second album, Folklore (2003), through DreamWorks Records, it was announced that Universal Music Group would acquire DreamWorks Records, the latter was folded into the Interscope Geffen A&M umbrella label where Furtado would release any new music. Recording sessions for Loose took place from 2005 to 2006. Timbaland and his protégé Danja produced the bulk of the album, primarily a pop album which incorporates influences of dance, R&B, hip hop, latin pop, synth-pop, reggaeton, new wave, funk, and Middle Eastern music. Lyrically, it explores the theme of female sexuality and has been described as introspective.

Overall, Loose was seen as critically and commercially successful. It reached high positions on the record charts of several markets, including number one in ten countries, and as of 2019, it has sold more than 10 million copies worldwide, making it one of the best-selling albums of the 2000s. However, the album received criticism because of the sexual image Furtado adopted, as some critics felt it was a ploy to sell more records.

Loose was heavily promoted, released in several editions and supported by the Get Loose Tour, which is the subject of the concert DVD, Loose: The Concert. The album debuted at number one on the US Billboard 200, making it Furtado's first album to top the chart, and spawned eight singles, including the Billboard Hot 100 number-one hits "Promiscuous" and "Say It Right", which received Grammy Award nominations for Best Pop Collaboration with Vocals and Best Female Pop Vocal Performance, respectively. Other notable singles include the UK Singles Chart number-one hit "Maneater" and the European number-one hit "All Good Things (Come to an End)”.

Background 
Furtado wanted to make a pop record to prove to herself that she could be more streamlined. Furtado cited Madonna's 1998 album Ray of Light as a major influence, saying "she was smooth but sexy, universal, epic, iconic!" Interscope chairman Jimmy Iovine suggested Furtado work with Timbaland, who had produced Missy Elliott's "Get Ur Freak On", which featured Furtado in a remix and a remix of Furtado's single "Turn Off the Light".

Recording 
Furtado began work on Loose by holding with emcee Jellystone what she referred to as a "hip-hop workshop", in which they would "write rhymes, dissect them, and try different flows over beats." The first producers she worked with were Track & Field—who co-produced her first two albums, Whoa, Nelly! (2000) and Folklore (2003)—and by May 2005, she had collaborated with Swollen Members and K'naan. Furtado worked with Nellee Hooper in London on reggae-oriented material and with Lester Mendez in Los Angeles on acoustic songs. One of the tracks Mendez helped to create is "Te Busqué", which is co-written by and features Juanes, who collaborated with Furtado on his 2002 song "Fotografía".
During her time in Los Angeles, she worked with Rick Nowels, who co-wrote and produced "In God's Hands", "Somebody to Love" and "Runaway".

In Miami, Florida, Furtado collaborated with Pharrell (who introduced her to reggaeton and who gave her a "shout-out" in his 2005 single "Can I Have It Like That") and Scott Storch (with whom she recorded a "straight-up rap song") before entering the studio with Timbaland. He and his protégé at the time, Danja, co-produced eight of the tracks, with another produced solely by Danja. For some of the beats on the songs, Timbaland finished work on ones already present in the studio that were half-developed or just "nucleuses"; the rest were completely reworked. Furtado recorded around forty tracks for Loose, deciding which she would include based on the sonics of the album—she called Timbaland "a sonic extraterrestrial" who came up with a sequence of songs that flowed, and said that the one she had devised was supposedly unsatisfactory. She recorded an unreleased collaboration with Justin Timberlake, "Crowd Control", which she described as "kind of sexy" and "a cute, clubby, upbeat, fun track". Other songs considered for inclusion on the album include "Chill Boy", "Friend of Mine", "Go", "Hands in the Air", "Pretty Boy", "Vice" and "Weak".

Furtado said in her diary on her official website that she recorded a remix of "Maneater" with rapper Lil Wayne; it was only released as part of a compilation album, Timbaland's Remix & Soundtrack Collection, she also used the instrumental of the song during many television performances of "Maneater". A version of "All Good Things (Come to an End)" featuring vocals by Coldplay lead singer Chris Martin, who co-wrote the song, was not released after a request from Martin's label, EMI. The song was released on the album, but only Furtado's vocals are featured. Furtado explained that "Loose was 90 percent written with a beat first, and then I’d write my melodies and songs to the beat."

Post-production 
The "off-the-cuff" conclusion to production was one of the reasons the album was titled Loose. It was named partly after the spontaneous decisions she made when creating the album.
The album is also called Loose because it is "the opposite of calculated" and came naturally to Furtado and Timbaland; she called him her "distant musical cousin because he was always pushing boundaries and always carving out his own path", which she believed she was doing with Loose. "I think you have to keep surprising people as an artist, and I like that—I love doing that", she said.
Loose was also named partly for the R&B girl group TLC, who Furtado said she admires for "taking back their sexuality, showing they were complete women." She said she wanted the album to be "assertive and cool" and "sexy but fun", like TLC, MC Lyte, Queen Latifah and Janet Jackson, who inspired Furtado because, as she put it, she was "comfortable in her sexuality and womanhood" when her 1993 single "That's the Way Love Goes" was released.

During the recording of Loose, Furtado listened to several electro and rock musicians, including Bloc Party, System of a Down, M.I.A., Feist, Queens of the Stone Age, Metric and Death from Above 1979, some of whom influenced the "rock sound" present on the album and the "coughing, laughing, distorted basslines" that were kept in the songs deliberately.
According to her, music by such bands is "very loud and has a garage theme" to it, some of which she felt she captured on the album. Furtado has said rock music is "rhythmic again" and hip-hop-influenced after it had become "so churning and boring."
Because the mixing engineers were aware of Timbaland and Furtado's rock influences, the songs were mixed on a mixing board in the studio instead of "the fancy mixer at the end". Furtado said she preferred the louder volume that process gave to the album because she wanted it to sound like her demo tapes, which she prefers to her finished albums. She said, "It didn't have that final wash over it; it didn't have the final pressing at the end, save for a couple sounds".

Music and lyrics 
Furtado said that with the release of her albums before Loose, she had wanted to prove herself as a musician and earn respect from listeners through using many different instruments on an album, which most hip-hop musicians did not do. After she believed she had accomplished that, she felt she had freedom to make the type of music she "really love[d]". Furtado's problem with hip-hop was that she did not think it was good enough to base one of her albums on, though she later asked herself why she was being "pretentious".
The album represents her separating from such notions and in her words, "jumping in the deep end of the pool—'Ahh, screw it, this is fun!'".
Furtado said she considers herself "all over the map" and promiscuous musically because she is not faithful to only one style.

For the first time, Furtado worked with a variety of record producers and followed a more collaborative approach in creating the album.
Produced primarily by Timbaland and Danja, Loose showcases Furtado experimenting with a more R&B–hip-hop sound and, as she put it, the "surreal, theatrical elements of '80s music".
She has categorized the album's sound as punk-hop, which she describes as Eurythmics-influenced "modern, poppy, spooky music" and stated that "there's a mysterious, after-midnight vibe to [it] that's extremely visceral."
Furtado has described the album as "more urban, more American, more hip-hop, [and] more simplified" than her earlier work, which she said was more layered and textured because she "tend[s] to overthink things." In contrast, during her studio time with Timbaland, she said she was "in the VIP boys club of just letting go" and being more impulsive.
According to Furtado, instead of "pristine stuff," the album features "really raw" elements such as distorted bass lines, laughter from studio outtakes and general "room for error." Furtado has said Loose is not as much about the lyrics, which are not included in the liner notes, as it is about "indulging in pleasures—whether it's dancing or lovemaking." According to her, she wasn't trying to be sexy with the album—"I think I just am sexy now," she said.

Loose is primarily a pop album with influences of dance, reggaeton, latin pop, hip hop, synth pop, Middle Eastern music, R&B, new wave, and funk.

Songs 
The opening track, "Afraid" (featuring rapper Attitude), depicts Furtado's fear of what people think of her, and she has said that the chorus reminds her of "walking down the hall in high school ... because you live from the outside in. Now that I'm an adult, I care about the inside of me ... Before I said I didn't care about what people thought about me, but I really did."
"Maneater" is an uptempo electro rock song that combines 1980s electro synths and a more dance-oriented beat. The up-tempo song has prominent electropop and synthpop influences and is lyrically related to how people become "hot on themselves" when dancing in their underwear in front of a mirror.
"Promiscuous" (featuring Timbaland) was inspired by a flirting exchange Furtado had with Attitude, who co-wrote the song.

She has characterized the fifth track, "Showtime", as "a proper R&B slow jam".
"No Hay Igual" is a hip-hop and reggaeton song, that has a Spanglish tongue twister over "future-tropic" beats. The song contains a "sharp mix" of percussion and "empowered chanting". In "No Hay Igual", Furtado sings in Spanish and raps in Portuguese over a reggaeton rhythm.
The album also features more introspective songs, and The Sunday Times wrote that it "has a surprising sadness to it." The seventh track, "Te Busqué", which features Latin singer Juanes, is about Furtado's experiences with depression, which she said she has had periodically since she was around seventeen years old.
Furtado said she was unsure what "Say It Right" is about, but that it encapsulates her feeling when she wrote it and "taps into this other sphere"; in an interview for The Sunday Times, it was mentioned that it is about her breakup with DJ Jasper Gahunia, the father of her daughter. "In God's Hands", another song on the album, was also inspired by the end of their relationship.

Release and promotion 

The album was first released in Japan on 7 June 2006, through Universal Music Group before being released two days later in Germany.
In the United Kingdom Loose was released on 12 June 2006, via Geffen Records and was released eight days later on 20 June 2006, in Canada and the United States.

In 2007 the album was re-released in Germany. The re-release included bonus content.

During the promotion of Loose, Furtado performed at major music festivals and award shows. In Europe, she appeared at Rock am Ring and Rock-im-Park in Germany and the Pinkpop Festival in the Netherlands in June 2006. She performed in Canada at the Calgary Stampede, the Ottawa Bluesfest in July, and at the Ovation Music Festival in September. Shortly after her August 2006 performance at the Summer Sonic in Japan, she sang at the Teen Choice Awards. In November, she contributed to the entertainment during the World Music Awards, the American Music Awards and the 94th Grey Cup halftime show. She performed at the 2007 NRJ Music Awards, held in January 2007.

Furtado embarked on a world concert tour, the Get Loose Tour, on 16 February 2007, in the UK, in support of the album; the tour included thirty-one dates in Europe and Canada, with additional shows in the US, Japan, Australia and Latin America. Furtado described the show as a "full sensory experience" with "a beginning, middle and end ... [it] takes you on a journey", also stressing the importance of crowd involvement and "spontaneity and rawness, because those are my roots, you know? I started by doing club shows, and that's the energy I love, the raw club energy of just feeling like you're rocking out." Though Furtado said choreographed dance routines were to be included in the show, she described it as "music-based ... Everything else is just to keep it sophisticated and sensual and fun." Furtado said she hoped to have Chris Martin, Juanes, Justin Timberlake, Timbaland and Calle 13 to guest on the tour, and have a "revolving door" of opening acts with Latin musicians opening in the US.

Furtado later released a digital reissue of the album on 4 June 2021, to Celebrate the Album's 15th Anniversary. The new expanded edition of Loose featured a selection of rare remixes and bonus tracks, like a version of "Do It" featuring Missy Elliott, as well as Spanish-language versions of "All Good Things (Come to an End)," "In God’s Hands," and "Te Busque," featuring Juanes. The tracklist also includes 12 remixes, including three different ones for "Promiscuous," done by Axwell, Crossroads Vegas, and Josh Desi, and an alternate version of "Say It Right," dubbed the "Reggae Main Mix," featuring Courtney John.

Singles 
In April 2006, a remix of "No Hay Igual" featuring the band Calle 13 was issued as a club single in the US. During the same period, "Promiscuous" (featuring Timbaland) was released for digital download in North America. Promiscuous became Furtado's first single to top the US Billboard Hot 100 and was released in Australia where it reached the top five. The lead single in Europe and Latin America, "Maneater," was released in late May to early June 2006. It became Furtado's first single to top the UK Singles Chart and made the top ten in other countries; it reached the top five in Germany and the top twenty in France and Latin America.
The second single in Europe, "Promiscuous," was released in late August to early September 2006 but it did not perform as well as "Maneater." It peaked inside the top five in the UK and the top ten in other countries, including Germany, and it reached the top twenty in France. During the same period, "Maneater" began its run as the second single in North America; it was not as successful as "Promiscuous," reaching number twenty-two in Canada and the top twenty in the US, though it became a top five single on the ARIA Singles Chart.

Releases of the third North American single, "Say It Right", and the third Europe single, "All Good Things (Come to an End)", took place in November and December, and the third Latin American single, "Promiscuous", was released in January 2007. "Say It Right" went to number one in the US and on the Nielsen BDS airplay chart in Canada (where it was not given a commercial release), and it reached the top five in Australia. "All Good Things (Come to an End)" reached number one on the pan-European singles chart and the top five in the UK, and it was the album's most successful single in Germany, where it topped the chart, and in France, where it became a top ten hit. After the release of "Say It Right" in Europe in March 2007, the single reached the top five in Germany and the top ten in the UK, where it was a download-only release. The video for "All Good Things (Come to an End)" was released in North America during this period. "All Good Things (Come to an End)" peaked in the top five in Canada and in the top twenty in Australia, though it only reached the lower half of the US Hot 100.

The album's fifth and final UK single was "In God's Hands", and the fifth and final single in North America was "Do It". In May 2007, Furtado mentioned the possibility of a sixth or seventh single, mentioning the examples of Nickelback's All the Right Reasons and the Pussycat Dolls' PCD as albums that were being supported by six or more singles at the time. Furtado said she liked the possibility because she thought Loose was good and "want[ed] people to hear as much of it as possible" before she took time off.
Two other songs, "Te Busqué" and "No Hay Igual", were released as singles in other regions of the world. "Te Busqué" was the lead single in Spain because of the limited success hip-hop/R&B-influenced songs in the style of "Promiscuous" and "Maneater" achieved in the country. It was not released in the United States, but it was given airplay on Latin music radio stations and reached the top forty on Billboard'''s Latin Pop Airplay chart. The "No Hay Igual" remix featuring Calle 13 was released in Latin America, and the music video debuted in September.

According to Media Traffic, worldwide sales of the singles stands at "Say It Right" (2007) 7.3 million copies, "Promiscuous" (2006) 4.81 million, "Maneater" (2006) 3.86 million copies and "All Good Things (Come to an End)" (2007) 3.425 million copies.

 Critical reception Loose received generally positive reviews from music critics; it holds an average score of 71 out of 100 at aggregate website Metacritic. AllMusic and musicOMH cited the "revitalising" effect of Timbaland on Furtado's music, and The Guardian called it "slick, smart and surprising." Q found most of it to be "an inventive, hip-hop-inflected delight." Kelefa Sanneh of The New York Times wrote that "the music and the lyrics are mainly aimed at dance floors, and yet this album keeps reminding listeners that a dance floor is one of the most complicated places on earth." In its review, AllMusic wrote "It's on this final stretch of the album that the Furtado and Timbaland pairing seems like a genuine collaboration, staying true to the Nelly of her first two albums, but given an adventurous production that helps open her songs up ... Timbaland has revitalized Nelly Furtado both creatively and commercially with Loose". She won her first BRIT Award—Best International Female—in 2007.

In a mixed review, Nick Catucci of The Village Voice felt that Furtado "sauces up a bit too luridly" and lacks "chemistry" with Timbaland, writing that Loose "isn't a love child, but a bump-and-grind that never finds a groove". Vibe  stated, "she loses herself in Gwen Stefani–like posturing, as on "Glow," and ethnic fusions like "No Hay Igual" or "Te Busqué." In his consumer guide for The Village Voice, Robert Christgau gave the album a "B" and named it "dud of the month", indicating "a bad record whose details rarely merit further thought." Christgau viewed that its dance-oriented tracks "might accomplish God's great plan on the dance-floor. But as songs they're not much".

 Commercial performance Loose debuted at number one on the Canadian Albums Chart, selling more than 34,000 copies in its first week, at that time the year's strongest debut for a Canadian artist. In late July, after Furtado embarked on a short tour of Canada and made a guest appearance on the television show Canadian Idol, the album returned to number one. It subsequently stayed near the top of the album chart until late January 2007, when it reached number one again for two weeks. It was the third best-selling album of 2006 in Canada, and the highest selling by a female solo artist, with 291,700 copies sold. The Canadian Recording Industry Association (CRIA) certified Loose five times platinum in May 2007 for shipments of more than 500,000 copies.
It stayed in the top twenty for fifty-seven weeks.

The album debuted at number one on the US Billboard 200 chart, making it Furtado's first album to top the chart with first-week sales of 219,000 copies; it was certified platinum by the Recording Industry Association of America (RIAA) and ranked sixty-fourth on the Billboard 2006 year-end chart. Loose exited the US top ten in August 2006 but re-entered it in March 2007, and according to Nielsen SoundScan in October 2007, it had sold two million units. The album ranked sixty four and thirty-second on the Billboard 2006 and 2007 year-end chart respectively.

In the United Kingdom, Loose entered the albums chart at number five; in its forty-third week, it reached number four, and it was certified double platinum for shipments to retailers of more than 600,000 copies."Certified Awards – Furtado Nelly, Loose, 2 x Platinum" . British Phonographic Industry (23 March 2007). Retrieved on 7 May 2008. As of July 2007, it had sold roughly 827,000 copies in the UK. The record was certified two times platinum in Australia for more than 140,000 units shipped; it reached number four there and was placed forty-fourth on the Australian Australian Recording Industry Association (ARIA) list of 2006 bestsellers. The album entered the chart in Germany at number one, spent a record forty-nine weeks in the German top ten, and was certified five times platinum. Loose reached number one on the European Top 100 Albums chart in early 2007, spending ten non-consecutive weeks at number one. By March 2007, it had been certified gold or platinum in twenty-five countries. As of 2019, the album has sold more than 12 million copies worldwide.

 Controversy 
Considerable attention was generated by the more sexual image of Furtado presented in promotion and publicity for the album, particularly in the music videos for "Promiscuous" and "Maneater", in which she dances around with her midriff exposed. According to Maclean's magazine, some said that Furtado's progression was a natural transformation of a pop singer; others believed that she had "sold out" in an effort to garner record sales, particularly after her second album was a commercial failure in comparison to her first. Maclean's wrote that her makeover "seems a bit forced" and contrasted her with singers such as Madonna and Emily Haines of Metric: "[they] seem to be completely in control, even somewhat intimidating in their sexuality: they've made a calculated decision for commercial and feminist reasons. In contrast, Furtado's new, overt sexuality comes off as unoriginal—overdone by thousands of pouty pop stars with a quarter of Furtado's natural talent ... the revamping feels as if it's been imposed rather than chosen by the unique, articulate singer we've seen in the past."Dose magazine wrote that Furtado's new "highly sexualized" image was manufactured, and noted the involvement in the album's development of Geffen's Jimmy Iovine, who helped to develop the Pussycat Dolls, a girl group known for their sexually suggestive dance routines. The writer also criticised Furtado's discussion of her buttocks and apparent rejection of feminism in a Blender magazine interview, writing: "Girls, do you hear that churning? Those are the ideas of Gloria Steinem turning in their grave." A writer for the CBC said that cynics could attribute Furtado's commercial success with Loose to her "amped-up sex appeal." The writer added that, the failure of Janet Jackson's album Damita Jo (2004) indicated such a move was not infallible. Furtado was "still demure compared to many of her competitors"—she avoided sporting lingerie or performing "Christina Aguilera-style gyrations or calisthenics" in the "Promiscuous" and "Maneater" videos. "Despite its dramatic arrival ... Furtado's new image doesn’t feel calculated", he said. "[She] seems to be thinking less and feeling more, to the benefit of her music."

However, a 2015 retrospective review of the album by Adria Young for Vice noted that, "When Looses second single 'Promiscuous' started its 24-hour rotations across Canada, Furtado was immediately and notably one of the first Canadian artists to experience public slut-shaming." Young further contends that, "the media also focused on bullshit like the kind of 'example' [Furtado] was setting, the 'tarting up' of a Canadian good-girl, romantic relationships between her and producers, her sexual orientation, her clothing, her 'midriff' and all kinds of superficial, sexist crap that had nothing to do with her music, what her music meant or what strength it might give to other women struggling with the very same gender dichotomies and double-standards around sexuality that the album was trying to explore."

In early 2007, a video hosted on YouTube led to reports that the song "Do It", and the Timbaland-produced ringtone "Block Party" that inspired it, used—without authorization—the melody from Finnish demoscene musician Janne "Tempest" Suni's song "Acidjazzed Evening", winner of the Assembly 2000 oldskool music competition. Timbaland used the record of C64 adaptation of the song written by Glenn Rune Gallefoss (GRG). Timbaland admitted sampling the song, but said that he had no time to research its intellectual owner. Hannu Sormunen, a Finnish representative of Universal which represents Nelly Furtado in Finland, commented the controversy as follows on 15 January 2007, issue of Iltalehti; "In case that the artist decides to pursue the matter further, it's on him to go to America and confront them with the local use of law. It will require a considerable amount of faith and, of course, money." On 9 February 2007, Timbaland commented on the issue in an MTV interview: "It makes me laugh. The part I don't understand, the dude is trying to act like I went to his house and took it from his computer. I don't know him from a can of paint. I'm 15 years deep. That's how you attack a king? You attack moi? Come on, man. You got to come correct. You the laughing stock. People are like, 'You can't be serious.'"

On 12 June 2009, Mikko Välimäki, who is one of the legal counsels of Kernel Records, the owner of the sound recording rights, reported that the case had been filed in Florida. In January 2008, Turkish newspapers reported that Kalan Müzik, the record label that released Turkish folk singer Muhlis Akarsu's album Ya Dost Ya Dost, pressed charges against Furtado for the Loose'' track "Wait for You", which label officials said features the bağlama instrumental part of Akarsu's song "Allah Allah Desem Gelsem".

Track listing

Notes

Credits and personnel 
Credits adapted from the album's liner notes.

 Nelly Furtado – lead vocals, songwriting
 Attitude – writing
 Rusty Anderson – acoustic guitar
 David Campbell  – conductor
 Roberto Cani, Josefina Vergara, Peter Kent, Amen Garabedian, Maria DeLeon, Geraldo Hilera, Sharon Jackson, Joel Derouin – violin
 Luis Conte, Daniel Stone, Taku Hirano, David Schommer, Luis Orbego – percussion
 Danja – drums, keyboards, piano
 Hilario Durán – piano
 Dean Jarvis – bass guitar
 Juanes – acoustic guitar, electric guitar
 Suzie Katayama, Larry Corbett, Steve Richards – cello
 Greg Kurstin, Jamie Muhoberac – keyboards
 Jamie Muhoberac – keyboard
 Rick Nowels – guitar, keyboards, piano
 Blake O, Dan Warner, Kevin Rudolf – guitar
 Ramón Stagnaro – acoustic guitar, electric guitar
 Nisan Stewart, Joey Waronker – drums
 Timbaland – vocals, writing, bass guitar, drums, keyboard, percussion

Production 

Thom Panunzio – executive producer
Timbaland – executive producer, producer, vocal assistance
Nelly Furtado – executive producer, producer
Danja – producer
Nisan Stewart – producer
Lester Mendez – producer
Rick Nowels – producer
Jim Beanz – vocal producer, vocal assistance
The Horace Mann Middle School Choirs – vocal assistance
Demacio Castellon – engineer
Vadim Chrislov – engineer
Ben Jost – engineer
Joao R. Názario – engineer
James Roach – engineer
Kobia Tetey – engineer
Joe Wohlmuth – engineer
Jason Donkersgoed – assistant engineer
Steve Genwick – assistant engineer
Kieron Menzies – assistant engineer
Dean Reid – assistant engineer
Marcella Araica – mixing
Demacio Castellón – mixing
Bard Haehnal – mixing
Dave Pensado – mixing
Neal H. Pogue – mixing
Chris Gerhinger – mastering
Thom Panunzio – A&R
D.J. Mormille – A&R
Evan Peters – A&R coordination
Jeanne Venton – A&R administration
JP Robinson – art direction
Gravillis Inc., Nevis – art direction
Anthony Mandler – photography
Cliff Feimann – production manager

Charts

Weekly charts

Year-end charts

Certifications and sales 

|-
!scope="row"|Romania (UFPR)
|3× Platinum
|
|-

Release history

See also 
List of certified albums in Romania

References

External links 
 Loose at Metacritic

2006 albums
Nelly Furtado albums
Interscope Records albums
Interscope Geffen A&M Records albums
Albums produced by Danja (record producer)
Albums produced by Timbaland
Albums produced by Thom Panunzio
Albums produced by Rick Nowels
Juno Award for Album of the Year albums
Juno Award for Pop Album of the Year albums
Dance-pop albums by Canadian artists
Sampling controversies